Harvey A. Dorfman (May 21, 1935 – February 28, 2011) was an American mental skills coach who worked in education and psychology as a teacher, counselor, coach, and consultant. Prior to becoming a mental skills coach, he lived in Manchester, Vermont where he wrote for a local paper, taught English, and coached basketball at Burr and Burton Academy. He earned World Series rings by serving as a mental skills coach for the 1989 Oakland A's and the 1997 Florida Marlins. In 1999, Dorfman became a full-time consultant teaching the skills of sport psychology and staff development for the Scott Boras Corporation, an agency that represents professional baseball players. A freelance journalist, Dorfman lectured at major universities and for corporations on psychology, self-enhancement, management strategies, and leadership training. He died on February 28, 2011.

Acclaimed former Philadelphia Phillies pitcher Jamie Moyer was a client of Dorfman's, as was former Toronto Blue Jays and Phillies ace Roy Halladay.  Moyer dedicated both his 2013 memoir and a planned pitching academy to his former counselor. "I learned so much from that man," Moyer said, "and to be able to use that knowledge for myself, I really believe I can help others go in the same direction." Dorfman played a role in developing the field of sports mental health and was described as a "pioneering sports psychologist".

Books 
The Mental ABC's of Pitching: A Handbook for Performance Enhancement, Diamond Communications (2000) 
The Mental Keys to Hitting: A Handbook of Strategies for Performance Enhancement, Diamond Communications (2001) 
The Mental Game of Baseball: A Guide to Peak Performance, with Karl Kuehl, Diamond Communications (1989,2002) 
Persuasion of My Days: An Anecdotal Memoir: The Early Years, Hamilton (2005)  
Coaching the Mental Game: Leadership Philosophies and Strategies for Peak Performance in Sports and Everyday Life, foreword by Carlos Tosca, Taylor Trade (2005) 
Copying It Down: An Anecdotal Memoir: Sport as Art, Hamilton (2009) 
Each Branch, Each Needle: An Anecdotal Memoir: The Final Stories, Hamilton (2010)

References 

1935 births
2011 deaths
20th-century American psychologists
American educators
State University of New York at Brockport alumni